Uttam Kumar was an Indian film actor, director, producer and singer who predominantly worked in Indian Cinema. Through his career he earned commercial as well as critical success, and he remains as an Bengal's cultural icon. For his ability to play roles of various types, Kumar is regarded as one of the greatest and most versatile actors in the history of Indian Cinema and is called as Mahanayak. Kumar was one of the most popular and successful actors in Bengali Cinema history. He debuted as Arun Kumar Chatterjee as a child artist in the 1948 film Drishtidaan directed by Nitin Bose. The film was unsuccessful. Next year he appeared as a leading hero as Uttam Chatterjee in the film Kamona 1949 which was flop again. He changed name again as Arup Kumar. In 1951 film Sahajatri he kept his name permanently as Uttam Kumar. But he gave back to back seven flop films and was stated as flop master general.

His first success came in the 1952 film Basu Paribar directed by Nirmal Dey. Next year along with same director, he worked with Suchitra Sen for the first time in Sharey Chuattor. The film became blockbuster and established him. He got his break in the 1954 film Agnipariksha of Agradoot's direction. He also playbacked in his film Nabajanma 1956. He produced six very successful bengali films from where he received four National Film Award. He also got success as director and composer. He directed three hit films like Sudhu Ekti Bachor, Bon Polashir Padabali and Kalankini Kankabati and composed superhit Kal Tumi Aleya. In 1966 he collaborated with the Oscar winning director Satyajit Ray's in the iconic cult classic Nayak which gave him the international recognization. It is considered as one of the best films in his entire career and also in Bengali cinema history. He acted in 202 released films in total, among which, 39 become blockbuster, 57 become superhit, 57 become hit and other 49 films become unsuccessful. He received eight times BFJA Best Actor Award. He became the first Indian actor to receive National Award for Best Actor for his performance in Anthony Firingee and Chiriyakhana 1967

Films

As producer

As director and screenplay

As playback singer and composer

References

External links
 

Male actor filmographies
Indian filmographies